An-Sophie Mestach was the defending champion, but lost in the semifinals to Tímea Babos.

Babos went on to win the tournament, defeating Ekaterina Bychkova in the final, 6–1, 6–2.

Seeds

Main draw

Finals

Top half

Bottom half

References 
 Main draw

Kangaroo Cup - Singles
2014 in Japanese tennis
Kangaroo Cup